Enis Destan (born 15 June 2002) is a Turkish professional footballer who plays as a striker for Ekstraklasa club Warta Poznań, on loan from Trabzonspor.

Club career

Altınordu
Destan came through the youth ranks of Altınordu, where he also began his senior professional career. He made his professional debut in his team's last fixture of 2019–20 TFF First League when he came on as a late substitute in a 1–1 draw against Menemenspor. In the next season, he scored 12 goals in 26 matches in the league and helped his team reach the play-off final for promotion to Süper Lig, where Altınordu lost 1–0 against local rivals Altay.

Trabzonspor
On 24 January 2022, he signed a four-and-a-half-year deal with Süper Lig side Trabzonspor.

Loan to Warta
After only appearing for Trabzonspor once since joining, in a Turkish Cup fixture, on 5 August 2022 Destan moved to Polish Ekstraklasa club Warta Poznań on a one-year loan spell.

International career
Destan was called up to Turkey national under-21 football team for the first time for friendly fixtures against Croatia and Serbia, making his debut against the former in a 4–1 loss substituting for Ali Akman in the second half. Before the second match, he was called up to the senior team for the 2022 FIFA World Cup qualification match against Latvia, where he was an unused substitute.

References

External links
 Profile at TFF
 

2002 births
Living people
Footballers from İzmir
Turkish footballers
Turkey under-21 international footballers
Turkey international footballers
Association football forwards
Altınordu F.K. players
Trabzonspor footballers
Warta Poznań players
TFF First League players
Süper Lig players
Ekstraklasa players
Turkish expatriate footballers
Expatriate footballers in Poland
Turkish expatriate sportspeople in Poland